Raiganj Government Medical College and Hospital (RGMC&H) is a tertiary referral Government Medical college. It was established in the year 2018. The college imparts the degree Bachelor of Medicine and Surgery (MBBS). The college is affiliated to West Bengal University of Health Sciences and is recognized by the National Medical Commission. The hospital associated with the college is one of the largest hospitals in the Uttar Dinajpur district. The selection to the college is done on the basis of merit through National Eligibility cum Entrance Test (Undergraduate).

. Yearly undergraduate student intake is 100 from the year 2019. There are two different campuses, main campus at Dr. B.C. Roy Sarani(District Hospital and Super Speciality Hospital campus, makeshift campus for medical college) and another campus for academic activities is under construction near bank of the Kulik river at Abdulghata, about 5 kilometres away from the main Hospital campus.

Courses
Raiganj Government Medical College, West Bengal undertakes education and training of students MBBS courses.

See also

References

External links 
 

Medical colleges in West Bengal
Universities and colleges in Uttar Dinajpur district
Affiliates of West Bengal University of Health Sciences
Educational institutions established in 2019
2019 establishments in West Bengal